Gilmore Tee (born Gilmore Qhawe Khumalo) is a Zimbabwean Media Practitioner, Curator, Cultural Manager and Fashionista. In 2019 he was listed among Forbes Africa's 30 under 30. Gilmore writes for Conde Nast GQ South Africa and Glamour Magazine South Africa. He is also the Founder and Curator of The PiChani, a PAN African lifestyle and cross-networking platform which integrates young entrepreneurs, leaders and achievers, from finance, creative, agriculture, civic, tourism, medical, technology, diplomatic and sports industries. It's the biggest dress-up event in Zimbabwe, hosted in Bulawayo, Zimbabwe.

Background
Gilmore was born in Bulawayo, Zimbabwe where he grew up. He attended early education at McKeurtan Primary School. He continued his high school at Gifford High School and St Gabriel’s College. He then proceeded to doing a Higher Diploma in French with CIEP – Centre International d’Etudes Pedagogiques under the Alliance Française, graduating in 2011. He later went on to doing Development Studies with the National University of Science and Technology.

Gilmore started his career in media at the age of 17 year as a Newsletter Editor for the Radio Dialogue Youth Press Bureau. In 2007, he was published in an Anthology by Mthwakazi Arts Festival, leading to him joining British Council’s Echoes Of Young Voices Group in 2008. In 2009, Gilmore was selected to represent Zimbabwe at the Global Youth Summit in the UK, a program by British Council. On coming back to Zimbabwe, he founded Deck Magazine alongside ETV Scandals’ Actress Mbo Mahocs, Chris Nqoe, Ntando Van Moyo and Sonny Jermain.

In 2014, Gilmore started a content creation and public relations company called Hunnar Management Agency, which then later rebranded in 2017 and became Paper Bag Africa. Gilmore started writing for Conde Nasts’ GQ South Africa & Glamour South Africa in 2017. Prio, he was a columnist at The Standard Newspaper and also hosted a weekly radio show with South Africa’s CliffCentral. In 2020 to 2021, he was the Zimbabwean representative for the MTV Africa Music Awards and also hosted the red carpet in 2016, 2017 and returned in 2022 as a host and Co-Producer of the Red Carpet at Zimbabwe Music Awards. 

Gilmore is a Licensee for MTV Staying Alive Foundation, involved in distributing the content for the HIV/AIDS awareness television and radio show, MTV Shuga. Gilmore was the Host & Producer of Award Nominated Prime Time television show, Thatha Wena which aired on Zimbabwe Broadcasting Cooperation. In 2019, Gilmore became the Festival Coordinator for the European Film Festival Zimbabwe which was established by the European Union Delegation. In the year 2019, Gilmore Founded & Curated The PiChani, a PAN African lifestyle and cross-networking platform which integrates young entrepreneurs, leaders and achievers, from finance, creative, agriculture, civic, tourism, medical, technology, diplomatic and sports industries. Yearly, The PiChani gathers a group of 200 of the above-mentioned, for an exclusive INVITE ONLY evening event with performances, showcases, food, drinks and exhibitions.  The PiChani has been attended by Award Winning South African Influencer - Mihlali Ndamase, Award Winning Media Personality - Luthanda "LootLove" Shosha, Editor-in-Chief for Glamour Magazine - South Africa, Nontando Mposo, ZiFM Stereo Radio Host - MisRed and South African Fashion Designer - Mzukisi Mbane. The PiChani has since partnered with Food Lovers Market, FastJet, Jameson Irish Whiskey, Habakkuk Trust, Khanondo Travel & Tours, Paper Bag Africa and Three Monkeys Wine. In 2021, the event had a digital footprint of 5 Million, increasing to 15 Million in 2022.

In 2021, Gilmore founded - eMoyeni Digital Storytelling, a project aimed at equipping content creators with skills on how best they can navigate the digital space to reach larger numbers with their content. The initiative has benefitted over 100 content creators who have been part of the 2 cohorts of participants. It has linked them to industry players such as Aljazeera's - Imran Garda, Media Personality - Vimbai Mutinhiri, US Based Actress - Sibongile Mlambo, and Editor-in-Chief for GQ South Africa - Molife Kumona, amongst many. Through his partnership with British Council, Gilmore led a Research Project called I Wear My Culture ZW, which explored on 10 Zimbabwean and 2 UK ethnic groups, zoning on their traditional cultural attires, house decorations, body art, sustainable practices and unique colours. The research which took over 8 months, involved 10 young designers traveling to the different ethnic groups' original locations to gather information. The end result of the project is 20 contemporary garments interpreting the findings, a fashion film and a mini-documentary captured by Prosper and Nicole Kunyetu.

Recognition
6 Inspiring Young people - Global Youth Summit 2009
Named one of the world’s most influential young people - Eduzine (UK) 2013
Style icon of the year - Zimbabwe Fashion Week Awards 2013
Community Leader Award (Nomination) - IARS Research and Youth Leadership Awards 2015
Male Fashionista of the Year (Nomination) - Abryanz Style and Fashion Awards 2016
FORBES Africa 30 Under 30 young leaders of 2019
GQ Best Dressed Men 2020
Youngest Board Member of Culture Fund Zimbabwe   
Board Member of the Bulawayo Polytechnic Applied Art and Design School
Former Vice President of the Alliance Francaise de Bulawayo Board
Gilmore becomes a Jameson Irish Whiskey Ambassador 2021 (#BuyOriginal) 
Provincial Judge (Bulawayo Metropolitan) - Miss Zimbabwe Queen 2022
Gilmore Tee partners with FastJet (2023)
Forty Under 40 Africa 2023

References

Zimbabwean mass media people

Living people

Year of birth missing (living people)